The Electrolux Trilobite is a robotic vacuum cleaner manufactured by the Swedish corporation Electrolux. It takes its name from the extinct arthropod, which scoured the ocean's floor. The prototype cleaner was first seen on the BBC television programme, Tomorrow's World, in May 1996, when it was demonstrated by presenter Philippa Forrester (actually announced by press release in the UK on 1 Dec 1997 ). It was the world's first commercially available autonomous vacuum cleaner, introduced as a product in 2001, model ZA1. A revision was released as Version 2.0 in 2004, model ZA2.

Description
The Trilobite contains a vacuum cleaner and a removable roller brush capable of working on deep-pile carpet. It has the ability to map rooms and avoid obstacles by using ultrasonic sensors (on the Mark 2 model also infrared). It recharges itself on a charging base, which it automatically finds when has completed its cleaning task or its power runs low. The Trilobite will indicate when the dustbin needs to be emptied.

Its ultrasonic sensors allow it to come within 1" of objects without colliding with them. This object detection is fairly reliable, but sometimes fails if the robot approaches an object with a sharp corner. In this case, the ultrasonic beam is not reflected, and the Trilobite will gently bump into the object. Because the Trilobite stops a short distance from walls and other objects, it leaves small areas that are not fully cleaned.

Magnetic strips are used to block off areas that the Trilobite should not enter, and infrared sensors (on the Mark 2 model) protect it from falling down stairs or off ledges.

Electrolux has discontinued the Trilobite, removing any product information from its website, referencing instead its Wikipedia page for information.

In September 2016, Electrolux introduced the successor to the Trilobite, the MotionSense. An international version of the teaser video was released on January 9, 2017.

Patents describing features of the Trilobite
 WO 02067744 (A1)  Wheel support arrangement for an autonomous cleaning apparatus.
 WO/1997/040734 Autonomous device.
 USPTO 7647144 Obstacle sensing system for an autonomous cleaning apparatus.
 US5935179A System and device for a self orienting device (the ultrasonic detection system)

See also
 Domestic robots
 List of vacuum cleaners
 Mobile robot
 Robotic mapping
 Robotic vacuum cleaner

References

External links
 Electrolux Trilobite homepage (archived copy of trilobite.electrolux.com)
 Everyday Robots  Review: Electrolux Trilobite Robotic Vacuum 
 Answers to Why the Trilobite Vacuum Robot is Expensive 
 BBC1 television listings for Friday 10 May 1996

Robotic vacuum cleaners
1996 robots
Robots of Sweden
Electrolux products
Rolling robots